WEPR is a noncommercial Classical/News/Talk in Greenville, South Carolina featuring both Classical music as well as news and other programs from NPR. The station is part of the statewide "Classical NPR network" from South Carolina Public Radio.

With its 85,000-watt ERP, WEPR is one of ETV Radio's most powerful stations. In addition to its primary coverage area of the Upstate, its signal penetrates well into Western North Carolina, providing city-grade coverage as far north as Asheville.

WEPR was the first public radio station in South Carolina, signing on in 1972. Originally licensed to Clemson, it moved to Greenville in the 1980s.

External links
South Carolina Public Radio's Website

South Carolina Educational Television
Classical music radio stations in the United States
EPR
NPR member stations
Radio stations established in 1972
Companies based in Greenville, South Carolina